"Looking Through Your Eyes" is the lead single for the Quest for Camelot soundtrack by American country pop recording artist LeAnn Rimes. The song placed at number four on the Adult Contemporary charts, number 18 on the Billboard Hot 100 chart, and number 38 in the UK. The song was also featured on Rimes' album Sittin' on Top of the World.  The song was performed on screen as a duet by Andrea Corr, the singing voice for the female lead Kayley, with Bryan White, the singing voice for the male lead of Garrett. It was also performed by David Foster as an instrumental on the soundtrack.

Track listing
US Single
 Looking Through Your Eyes – 4:07
 Commitment – 4:36

Charts

Weekly charts

Year-end charts

Certifications

|}

Music video
The music video was directed by Chris Rogers and produced by Jamie Amos, and features Rimes performing the song, complete with footage from the movie.

References

1997 songs
1998 singles
LeAnn Rimes songs
Songs written by David Foster
Songs written by Carole Bayer Sager
Country ballads
Pop ballads
Songs written for animated films
Songs written for films